{{Taxobox
| name = Mansonella ozzardi
| regnum = Animalia
| phylum = Nematoda
| classis = Secernentea
| ordo = Spirurida
| familia = Onchocercidae
| genus = Mansonella
| species = M. ozzardi
| species_authority = Manson, 1897
}}Mansonella ozzardi'' is a filarial (arthropod-borne) nematode (roundworm). This filarial nematode is one of two that causes serous cavity filariasis in humans. The other filarial nematode that causes it in humans is Mansonella perstans.  M. ozzardi is an endoparasite that inhabits the serous cavity of the abdomen in the human host. It lives within the mesenteries, peritoneum, and in the subcutaneous tissue.

Morphology
Like other nematodes, M. ozzardi is a cylindrical and bilaterally symmetrical worm, with a pseudocoel, or a false body cavity. The exterior of the parasite, the cuticle, is a protective layer that can withstand the harsh environment in the digestive tracts of the human hosts.

M. ozzardi and other nematodes have longitudinal muscles that run along the body wall. They also have dorsal, ventral, and longitudinal nerve cords connected to these longitudinal muscles.

In the adult stages of M. ozzardi, the females are larger than the males.

M. ozzardi is usually smaller than those Onchocerca Volvulus (that causes human onchocerciasis) when both species co-exist; especially in some rural areas in Brazil, within the Amazonian onchocerciasis focus.

Reproduction
This is a dioecious species; the female is believed to release a pheromone to attract males. When the male finds the female, he will coil around the female over the genital pore. The male's spicules are used to hold the female during copulation. The females are ovoviviparous. The sperm of a nematode lacks a flagellum. Its motility is due to its amoeboid-type cell.

Geographic range

This is a New World parasite. It is prominent in the subtropical, tropical, and temperate regions of Central and South America (Mexico, Panama, Brazil, Colombia, and Argentina), and the Caribbean.
The prevalence of M. ozzardi in Brazil is very high; about 44-52% of Brazilian farmers are infected. It is also prevalent with the American Indian population. Many transmission hotspots in the Amazon Basin map to indigenous communities. Endemicity levels vary widely among rural villages, situated a few kilometers apart along the same rivers in the western Amazon Basin of Brazil 

Lifecycle

 An arthropod (black fly or biting midge) will take a blood meal from a human and will insert its third-stage filarial larvae into the human host.
 The larvae will then become adults and will inhabit the peritoneal spaces and adjacent locations.
 The adults will mate and produce unsheathed microfilariae. These microfilariae will go to the bloodstream.
 An arthropod will take a blood meal from an infected human and ingest the microfilariae.
 In the arthropod, the microfilariae will travel from the midgut to the thoracic muscles.
 In the thoracic muscles, the microfilariae will develop into the first-stage larvae.
 Later, the microfilariae will further develop into the third-stage larvae.
 The third-stage larvae will travel from the thoracic muscles to the arthropod's proboscis. This is the stage where the arthropod can infect a human when it takes a blood meal.

Transmission
M. ozzardi is transmitted by two types of arthropods that feed on the blood of humans: biting midges (genus Culicoides) and blackflies (genus Simulium). In the Caribbean, M. ozzardi uses the biting midge as its intermediate host. The black fly serves as the intermediate host for the filariae parasite in the Amazon Basin and mainland South America.

Biting midge

The biting midges are small flies that breed on sandy beaches near the sea. Some species also lay their eggs on decaying leaf litter, humus, manure, and partially rotten vegetation, in tree holes, and the cut stumps of banana trees. They feed on the blood of mammals, birds, reptiles, and humans. Their short mouthparts prohibit them from biting through clothing. As a result, they prefer to feed on the head or other exposed body parts. Blood meals occur throughout the day and night, but biting activity peaks during the early evening. Since individual bites can be painful, they are a cause of concern because they tend to attack in swarms of hundreds or thousands. Due to their small size, they can pass through mesh mosquito nets.

Black fly

The blackflies are larger blood-sucking flies that breed in fast-flowing streams and rivers. Their larvae can be found attached to submerged vegetation and stones of infected waterways. Blood meals occur during the day in the outdoors, especially along riverbeds. After a meal, the flies rest for 2–3 days on trees and other vegetation to digest the blood. Like the biting midges, blackflies attack their victims in swarms and their bites are painful. The bites may cause swelling, inflammation, and irritation that may last for weeks.

Pathology

Symptoms
The pathogenicity of M. ozzardi needs further research. Although the adult worms live in the body cavities and the mesentery, they do cause clinical manifestations to their human hosts.  
 Moderate fever
 Coldness in the legs
 Joint pains, like articular pain or arthralgias
 Headaches
 Pruritus (itchiness)
 Skin eruptions
 Pulmonary symptoms
 Lymphadenitis - inflammation of the lymph nodes
 Adenopathy - enlargement of the lymph nodes
 Hepatomegaly - enlargement of the liver
 Calabar like swellings that radiate out from core [10]

M. ozzardi is also considered as a possible cause for corneal lesions. Even though there is no significant evidence for it, but in certain regions in Central and South America where both M. ozzardi and O. volvulus co-occur, skin biopsies have always showed that onchoserciasis is the cause for corneal lesions.

Diagnosis
Microscopic examination is the most practical diagnostic tool used to identify the M. ozzardi microfilariae in blood samples from infected patients. Blood smears are usually stained with haematoxylin or Giemsa to visualize the worms under the microscope.

Diagnosticians must not rely entirely on blood samples, since microfilariae have also been detected in the skin. Ultrasound may be used to detect the presence of the adult worms. Researchers are currently developing a polymerase chain reaction-based method of detecting the parasites in skin biopsies.

Because M. ozzardi harbors the endosymbiotic bacteria Wolbachia, doxycycline may be an effective therapy to eliminate adult worms. However, no trials with doxycycline (either alone or in combination with ivermectin) have been conducted for M. ozzardi infection.

Treatment
Ivermectin is the treatment of choice for M. ozzardi infections. It is a potent macrocyclic lactone that binds to chloride channels, which then open and allow chloride ions to enter the affected cells. These cells hyperpolarize, resulting in muscle paralysis in the M. ozzardi microfilariae. This allows host immune cells to adhere to the microfilariae surface and facilitate their elimination. Ivermectin is unable to kill the adult worms.

Diethylcarbamazine (DEC) also has been used in treating filarial infections. While DEC works well against many filarial parasites, it is not effective in treating M. ozzardi microfilarial infections.

Disease control
Aside from ivermectin, preventive measures can be taken by individuals living in areas endemic to M. ozzardi. Since biting midges cannot bite through clothing, those living in the Caribbean should wear long-sleeved shirts and pants to decrease the body parts exposed. Insect repellents could also be used to cover body parts not protected by clothing. Communities should also maintain the natural vegetation around them to decrease the possible breeding grounds for the biting midges.

In South America, the best way to control the population of blackflies, and the transmission of M. ozzardi, is to apply insecticides specific for blackfly larvae to streams and rivers. Application of insecticide to a specific breeding site also kills larvae in breeding sites up to 10 km downstream. Extensive networks of waterways must be treated with insecticide since blackflies have the ability to fly with the wind for several hundreds of kilometers. Individuals should also avoid the waterways whenever possible.

10. Petersen, J.L, M.P.Bawden, F. Stephen Wignall, Carmen Latorre, Carl M. Johnson APCM, and Charles R. Miranda. Mansonella ozzardi en el Darien (Panama). Revista Medica de Panama 9:236-246. 1984

References

 Lima, N. F., Veggiani Aybar, C. A., Dantur Juri, M. J., & Ferreira, M. U. (2016). Mansonella ozzardi: a neglected New World filarial nematode. Pathogens and Global Health, 110(3), 97–107. http://doi.org/10.1080/20477724.2016.1190544
 Bartoloni, Alessandro et al. 1999. Mansonella ozzardi Infection in Bolivia: Prevalence and Clinical Associations in the Chaco Region. American Journal of Tropical Medicine and Hygiene 61: 830-833.
 Gordoy, Gerardo et al. 1980. Mansonella ozzardi Infections in Indians of the Southwestern Part of the State of Bolivar, Venezuela. American Journal of Tropical Medicine and Hygiene 29: 373-376.
 Kozek, W. J. et al. 1982. Filariasis in Colombia: Prevalence of Mansonellosis in the Teenage and Adult Population of the Colombian Bank of the Amazon, Comisaría del Amazonas. American Journal of Tropical Medicine and Hygiene 31: 1131-1136.
 Ottesen, E. A. and W. C. Campbell. 1994. Ivermectin in Human Medicine. Journal of Antimicrobial Chemotherapy 34: 195-203.
 Medeiros, J. F. et al. 2008. Current Profile of Mansonella ozzardi (Nematoda: Onchocercidae) in Communities Along the Ituxi River, Lábrea Municipality, Amazonas, Brazil. Memórias do Instituto Oswaldo Cruz 103: 409-411.
 Morales-Hojas, Ramiro et al. 2001. Characterization of Nuclear Ribosomal DNA Sequences from Onchocera volvulus and Mansonella ozzardi (Nematoda: Filarioidea) and Development of a PCR-based Method for Their Detection in Skin Biopsies. International Journal for Parasitology 31: 169-177.
 Shelley, A. J. and S. Coscarón. 2001. Simuliid Blackflies (Diptera: Simuliidae) and Ceratopogonid Midges as Vectors of Mansonella ozzardi (Nematoda: Onchocercidae) in Northern Argentina. Memórias do Instituto Oswaldo Cruz 96: 451-458.
 Tidwell, M. A. and M. A. Tidwell. 1982. Development of Mansonella ozzardi in Simulium amazonicum, S. argentiscutum, and Culicoides insinuatus from Amazonas, Columbia. American Journal of Tropical Medicine and Hygiene 31''': 1137-1141.
10. Petersen, J.L, M.P.Bawden, F. Stephen Wignall, Carmen Latorre, Carl M. Johnson APCM, and Charles R. Miranda. Mansonella ozzardi en el Darien (Panama). Revista Medica de Panama 9:236-246. 1984

Spirurida

Parasitic nematodes of humans
Endoparasites